"Redrum" is the sixth episode of the eighth season of the American science fiction television series The X-Files. The story for the episode was developed by Steven Maeda and Daniel Arkin, the teleplay was written by Maeda, and the episode was directed by Peter Markle. "Redrum" is a "Monster-of-the-Week" story, unconnected to the series' wider mythology. The episode received a Nielsen rating of 8.1 and was viewed by 13.2 million households. Overall, the episode received moderately positive reviews from critics.

The series centers on FBI special agents Dana Scully (Gillian Anderson) and her new partner John Doggett (Robert Patrick)—following the alien abduction of her former partner, Fox Mulder (David Duchovny)—who work on cases linked to the paranormal, called X-Files. In this episode, a lawyer friend of Doggett's named Martin Wells tries to clear his name of the crime after his wife is murdered. Unfortunately for him, his perception of time regresses backwards, day by day. This leads to confusion, but ultimately an answer as to who killed Wells' wife.

"Redrum", described as a "Twilight Zone-type thriller" by critics, heavily featured the actor Joe Morton, who had previously played a role in the 1991 sci-fi film Terminator 2: Judgment Day alongside series co-star Robert Patrick. The title of the episode was purposely picked by episode writer Steven Maeda to be "murder" spelled backwards, a reference to Stephen King's The Shining. The episode's main character, Martin Wells, was named after famed 19th century author H. G. Wells.

Plot
Martin Wells, a renowned Baltimore prosecutor, wakes up in a prison cell and notices a stitched-up wound on his right cheek. A guard enters and takes him for his transfer. Wells' long-time friend, John Doggett (Robert Patrick), and Doggett's partner, Dana Scully (Gillian Anderson), await him and warn of reporters outside. As he exits the building, a man Wells recognizes draws a pistol and shoots him. Wells stares at Scully's watch as he dies. The hands stop and then begin to turn backwards.

Upon waking up again, Wells is surprised to find no bullet wounds on his body. Scully and Doggett arrive to interrogate Wells, but he is confused about what is going on. A furious Doggett claims that he has been accused of murdering his wife, Vicky, and initially believes that Wells is faking his confusion in order to build an insanity defense. However, Doggett shows signs of doubt when he notices Wells' genuine anguish over Vicky's death. Wells is brought into court and he recognizes his father-in-law, Al Cawdry, as the man who shot him. When Wells' next court date is announced to be Thursday, he realizes that he has somehow travelled back to the day before his shooting. When the judge decides to transfer Wells to a different cell, he makes a scene in the court and accuses Cawdry of planning to kill him during the transfer.

In his second meeting of the day with Scully and Doggett, Wells explains that he cannot remember the last few days. Scully suggests that maybe he did do it. Wells begins having flashes of the murder but they are unclear. Waiting in his cell, he kills a spider. Later, a nanny cam from his house reveals that the only person to arrive between the police's arrival and the last time his wife is on camera is Martin Wells. Eventually, Wells meets his lawyers and tells them about the nanny cam. However, it turns out that it is Wednesday: Wells is somehow “living the week backwards”.

While going to meet Doggett and Scully, Wells gets shoved into a dominos game and while picking them up gets slashed on his right cheek from a man with the spider web tattoo on his hand. Wells tells Doggett and Scully that he is moving backwards in time and cannot recall the past few days. Doggett is skeptical, but Scully hears him out. Wells says there must be a reason for it and Scully suggests that the answer may already be within him. Studying the evidence of the case, Wells has a flash of the murder that reveals the knife in a hand with a spider web tattoo.

Martin next awakes in Doggett's home. Wells tells Doggett the description of the killer but the man isn't in lock-up yet because that won't happen until Wednesday. Doggett and Wells arrive at the apartment and retrieve the nanny cam, but discover that someone disabled the cam and used its remote control, a device no one knew about except Mr. and Mrs. Wells and their nanny, Trina Galvez. At Trina Galvez's home, Wells and Doggett discover the killer, a man named Cesar Ocampo, who threatened to kill Galvez's family if she refused him entrance. At the station house, Doggett informs Wells that Ocampo only wants to talk to him. Ocampo reveals that his brother, Hector, was sentenced to time in prison for a false conviction. Wells bargains with Cesar Ocampo, saying that if Cesar confesses to Vicky's murder, he will take a look at his brother's case. Cesar tells him that Hector hung himself in a jail cell a few weeks ago. Doggett calls Martin Wells out into the hall and the police arrest Martin because they have a case against him. Evidence against Ocampo isn't strong enough yet.

Martin wakes up in a hotel room, having moved back to the night of the day before, a little over two hours before the murder of his wife is supposed to take place. Desperate to save her, but unable to contact her over the phone, Martin instead visits Doggett, and admits to evidence suppression, explaining that Hector Ocampo's brother is out for revenge. Doggett contacts the local police, while Wells rushes home and finds his wife, still alive. Suddenly, they hear someone else at the door. Ocampo appears and accosts Wells. Vicky Wells comes out of hiding but is thrown through the coffee table. As Ocampo prepares to slit her throat, he is shot dead by the timely arriving Doggett and Scully. Wells notices Scully's watch once more, seeing that its hands start moving forwards again, indicating that whatever phenomenon that sent him backwards in time has reached its conclusion. Wells eventually goes to prison for his evidence suppression, a punishment he feels he deserves.

Production

"Redrum", described as a "Twilight Zone-type thriller" in The Complete X-Files, was developed by Steven Maeda and Daniel Arkin, while the teleplay was written solely by Maeda. Maeda purposely picked the title to be the backwards spelling of "murder". (the same plot device was used by novelist—and one-time X-Files writer—Stephen King in his book The Shining.) Maeda used the spider and its web to symbolize Martin Wells' confusion at being trapped in his situation. Several of the names in the episode were allusions to historical figures or acquaintances of the writer. Most notably, Martin Wells is named after famed 19th century author H.G. Wells, noted for his contributions to science fiction with The Time Machine in 1896 and The War of the Worlds in 1898. Furthermore, the character of Janet Wilson, the lawyer of Wells, was named after Maeda's wife.

Wells was played by noted actor Joe Morton who had previously played a role in the 1991 sci-fi film Terminator 2: Judgment Day. Robert Patrick later noted that "Joe Morton is a fantastic actor. We never worked together in [Terminator 2], but we're in that movie together. And Joe was The Brother from Another Planet." The scene in which Martin Wells is assassinated was at the "legendary" Ambassador Hotel in Los Angeles. This location, which has been the shooting location for over 200 productions, is perhaps more infamous as the site of Presidential candidate Robert F. Kennedy's assassination by Sirhan Sirhan in 1968.

Morton and Bellamy Young would work together again 12 years later on the ABC show Scandal.

Reception
"Redrum" first aired on Fox on December 10, 2000. The episode earned a Nielsen household rating of 8.1, meaning that it was seen by 8.1% of the nation's estimated households. The episode was viewed by 8.16 million households, and 13.2 million viewers. The episode ranked as the 40th most-watched episode for the week ending December 10. The episode subsequently aired in the United Kingdom on the BBC Two on April 14, 2002. Fox promoted the episode with the tagline "How do you stop a murder that's already happened?"

Critical reception to the episode was moderately positive, although several reviewers criticized the episode's monologues. Television Without Pity writer Jessica Morgan rated the episode a "B+". Morgan criticized the episode's narrative, sardonically noting that Martin Wells was a "man who may get a second chance. At life. At truth. At pretentious, overlong monologues." Juliette Harrisson of Den of Geek wrote positively of the episode, calling it "an excellent backwards episode, in which the audience is left satisfied that the horrific event that sparked it off has been prevented, but the guest protagonist has to pay a high price for the happy outcome." However, she was slightly critical that the episode "barely features the regular characters at all". Paula Vitaris from Cinefantastique gave the episode a moderately positive review and awarded it three stars out of four. She called the episode "a double mystery: on one hand Martin's investigation of his wife's murder; and on the other, an investigation into the workings of his own soul."  Vitaris, too, was critical of the ending monologue, noting that "the voiceover ruins the mood of the final shot."

Zack Handlen of The A.V. Club awarded the episode a "B+", writing that it was an "example of an episode that starts off strong, only to fumble when it comes to the follow through". He was particularly praiseworthy towards Morton's performance, noting that his presence "more than makes up for" the lack of Doggett and Scully. He concluded that the episode is "a smart that the script makes Wells in some way culpable for what happened, and tries to establish him as a merciless hard-ass" but that the "reveal is never really satisfying." Robert Shearman and Lars Pearson, in their book Wanting to Believe: A Critical Guide to The X-Files, Millennium & The Lone Gunmen, gave the episode a moderately positive review and rated it three-and-a-half stars out of five. The two noted that the episode was "constructed with great skill by Steven Maeda and Daniel Arkin." Despite this, Shearman and Pearson noted that "with the series in flux, this is an especially unhelpful time to attempt an episode which so abandons the house style; The X-Files urgently needs to assert what it is, not what it isn't."

Notes

Footnotes

Bibliography

External links 

2000 American television episodes
Television episodes set in Baltimore
Television episodes about murder
The X-Files (season 8) episodes